DI Chamaeleontis, also known as Hen 3-593 or HIP 54365, is a quadruple star system in the constellation Chamaeleon. The system is roughly 700 light years from Earth.

DI Cha is a variable star of the T Tauri type, young stellar objects just approaching the main sequence. It varies erratically between visual magnitudes 10.65 and 10.74. Although it is visually faint, it was noticed because of the prominent emission lines in its spectrum.

In 1977, DI Cha was observed to have a much fainter companion. The separation was later measured at 4.6", approximately 644 astronomical units (AU). The B component was discovered to be a pair of stars separated by only 0.066", about 10 AU, both with spectral type M5.5. Finally, the variable primary star was found to have a faint companion 0.2" (therefore ~30 AU) away, of spectral type M6.

References

4
G-type main-sequence stars
M-type main-sequence stars
T Tauri stars
Chamaeleon (constellation)
Chamaeleonis, DI
054365
Durchmusterung objects